Hathor 10 - Coptic Calendar - Hathor 12

The eleventh day of the Coptic month of Hathor, the third month of the Coptic year. On a common year, this day corresponds to November 7, of the Julian Calendar, and November 20, of the Gregorian Calendar. This day falls in the Coptic season of Peret, the season of emergence.

Commemorations

Saints 

 The martyrdom of Saint Michael the Monk 
 The martyrdom of Saint Archelaus and Saint Elisha the Hegumen 
 The departure of Saint Anna, the mother of the Virgin Mary

References 

Days of the Coptic calendar